is a Japanese animation studio that specializes in chibi-style anime.

Works

Television series

Films

Original video animations

Original net animations

References

External links

  
 

 
Japanese animation studios